Baitings Reservoir is a large water supply reservoir operated by Yorkshire Water close to Ripponden in the West Yorkshire Pennines, England. It lies in the valley of the River Ryburn and is the higher of two reservoirs built to supply Wakefield with water and was completed in 1956. The lower reservoir is Ryburn Reservoir.

History
Wakefield Corporation Waterworks started impounding the valley of the River Ryburn in the 1930s, with Ryburn Reservoir being completed in 1933. Construction on Baitings took place 20 years later with completion in 1956. Baitings is a place name that derives from the Old Norse of Beit (pasture) and Eng (meadow), Baitings Bridge, on an old road linking Yorkshire and Lancashire, was to be flooded under the reservoir so a concrete viaduct was built. During spells of very hot weather and drought conditions, the old packhorse bridge is revealed.

A tunnel connects reservoirs in valleys to the north with Baitings to allow for the transfer of water.

In 1989, the body of a man was found at the bottom of the reservoir during a period of dry weather, when the water was  shallower than normal. He had been murdered and his body was weighted down with a pick axe. The crime was featured on Crimewatch and remains unsolved.

References

External links

Images of the reservoir and surrounding area

Reservoirs in West Yorkshire
Protected areas of West Yorkshire
Ripponden